Julia Giesberts or Wilhelmina Julia Giesberts (1893-1983) was a Dutch painter and printmaker.

Biography
Giesberts was born on 9 May 1893 in Amsterdam. She studied at the Rijksakademie van beeldende kunsten (State Academy of Fine Arts). Her work was included in the 1939 exhibition and sale Onze Kunst van Heden (Our Art of Today) at the Rijksmuseum in Amsterdam.

Giesberts died on 30 October 1983 in Haarlem.

References

1893 births
1983 deaths
Dutch women artists